The Einstein Medical Center Philadelphia is a non-profit hospital located in North Philadelphia, Pennsylvania. The hospital is a part of the Einstein Healthcare Network. The medical center offers residency and fellowship training programs in many specialized areas. It also includes a Level I Regional Resource Trauma Center and a Level III Neonatal Intensive Care Unit. Einstein Medical Center Philadelphia is the largest independent teaching hospital in the Philadelphia region with over 30 accredited programs training over 3,500 students each year with 400 residents.

History
Founded as the Jewish Hospital for the Aged, Infirmed and Destitute (Jewish Hospital for short) in August 1864, this hospital was an important institution in the history of the Jews in Philadelphia, providing care for "the suffering poor of all religions". It officially opened in 1866, starting with 22 beds at 56th and Haverford Road in West Philadelphia. The hospital expanded, moving to Old York Road in 1873, and opening various homes and clinics. By the 20th century, Jewish-sponsored hospitals such as the Jewish Hospital became havens for Jewish doctors who could not admit their patients to other hospitals because of anti-Semitism.

In 1951, the hospital was named for Albert Einstein after the volunteer president of Mount Sinai wrote a letter asking Einstein for permission to use his name. Einstein granted his permission. In 1952, the Jewish Hospital merged with Northern Liberties Hospital and Mount Sinai Hospital to form a single medical center.

Einstein Medical Center discouraged nurses from joining unions. From 2014 to 2017 the hospital spent "$1.1 million on union avoidance". Nurses voted to unionize with the PASNAP in 2016.

Synagogue
The Henry S. Frank Memorial Synagogue, on the hospital grounds, is listed on the National Register of Historic Places. It is a copy of the ancient synagogue at Kfar Bar'am, Israel.

References

External links
 
 Einstein Medical Center locations
 Map of Einstein's Main Campus

Hospital buildings completed in 1866
Hospital buildings completed in 1873
Hospitals in Philadelphia
1864 establishments in Pennsylvania
Jewish medical organizations
Hospitals established in 1864
Hospitals established in 1866
Trauma centers